The Australasian swamphen (Porphyrio melanotus) is a species of swamphen (Porphyrio) occurring in eastern Indonesia (the Moluccas, Aru and Kai Islands), Papua New Guinea, Australia and New Zealand. In New Zealand, it is known as the pūkeko. The species used to be considered a subspecies of the purple swamphen.

Distribution
The Australasian swamphen occurs in mainland Australia, eastern Indonesia, the Moluccas, Aru and Kai Islands, and in Papua New Guinea. It is also found on New Zealand's main islands and in the Chatham and Kermadec Islands. It has a small shield, black upperparts, and a purple throat and breast. P. p. pelewensis (Hartlaub & Finsch, 1872) from Palau, resembles melanotus but has greener upperparts and is smaller. P. p. melanopterus (Bonaparte, 1856) is found from the Lesser Sundas and Moluccas to New Guinea. It is as melanotus but smaller, more variable and less blue in the upperparts. P. p. bellus (Gould, 1820) from Western Australia is as melanotus but has a cerulean blue throat and breast. P. p. samoensis (Peale, 1848) occurs from New Guinea to New Caledonia and Samoa, and is as melanotus but smaller, with a brown tinge on the back

Establishment in New Zealand
According to the Heather and Robertson Field Guide,
the bird seems to have become established in New Zealand about 1000 years ago. According to Millener (1981), it invaded from Australia less than 1,000 years ago. It is also assumed to have spread from Australia to New Guinea. Some assume that it became established before humans in New Zealand, but all known fossils occur in sites younger than 400 years and there is no evidence that they were on the main islands of New Zealand before the Māori arrived. East Coast Māori say they came to New Zealand on the Horouta canoe which arrived about 24 generations ago.
The Aotea tribe of the West Coast say that their ancestors introduced pūkeko in the Aotea canoe.

In support of the belief that it is a good flyer, and may have self-introduced, a dead pūkeko was found on L'Esperance Rock, a tiny, isolated rock in the Kermadec group, more than 200 km from the nearest established population. This demonstrates the ability of swamphens to fly great distances over the sea. This ability to disperse is not unique to swamphens, but is common to all continental Rallidae, hence they are often found on remote islands.

Description

The New Zealand population (along with green-yellow swamphens in Tasmania) are possibly slightly larger than mainland Australian birds, but are otherwise identical. When threatened, they will often walk away from danger rather than fly.  When they fly, take-offs and landings are clumsy, and short flight distances are preferred.

Ecology
Australasian swamphens are considered to be the ancestors of several island species including the extinct Lord Howe swamphen and two species of takahē in New Zealand. On islands where closely related species have become extinct or declined due to human interference, such as New Zealand or New Caledonia, this species has established itself relatively recently.

Defence and behaviour
They live in groups of 3–12 individuals and are known to group together and shriek loudly to defend nests successfully during attacks by Australasian harriers. When unsuccessful at repelling predators, they may abandon their nest sites. A recent arrival to New Zealand, they have thrived in an environment that now contains introduced predators such as cats, rodents and mustelids (Brunin and Jamieson, 1995).

In Polynesian culture
The colour red was associated with nobility and power by Māori in New Zealand, so the bird was held in high esteem and held as a chiefly pet because of its red beak and legs. In Samoa, it is called manuali'i (literally, "chiefly bird"). Red was the prized color of Polynesian aristocracy and while birds with red plumage (such as the red-tailed tropicbird, some Hawaiian honeycreepers like the iiwi and maroon shining parrot) were highly prized, the swamphen was unique in deriving its prestige not from plumage but from its reddish face, beak, and legs. In old Samoa only chiefs could keep such birds as pets, and early European sailors noticed tethered and/or caged swamphens treated by Samoan chiefs as tamed pets. Some Samoans also considered the swamphen to be the incarnation of a mischievous, aggressive demon called Vave. There is no tradition of swamphens being taken as sport game or poultry food, except perhaps in time of necessity.

Māori metaphor
Pūkeko are known for their bold scheming and determination. In times past, they raided gardens for kumara (sweet potato) and taro. A stubborn, annoying person was compared metaphorically to the bird, and was said to have pūkeko ears (taringa Pākura, using Pākura, another Māori word for the pūkeko). They are known to steal eggs from each other and this is an indication of their character.

Māori mythology
In New Zealand, the pūkeko is mentioned in the Māori myth "How the Kiwi lost her wings" in which several birds of the forest are asked to come down from the trees to eat the bugs on the ground and save the forest, but all give excuses except the kiwi who is willing to give up his colours and the ability to fly. The pūkeko's excuse is that it looks too damp down there, and he does not want to get his feet wet. The pūkeko is punished for his reluctance and told he must now live forever in the swamps.

By one account, the pūkeko is the spawn of Punga (the ancestor of sharks and reptiles – enemies of the people) but was claimed by relative (and high chief) Tawhaki.  Tawhaki cut himself while cutting timber and so daubed the pūkeko's forehead with his own blood to signify their bond.  So the mischievous pūkeko gets his character from Punga and his noble badge from Tawhaki.

Hunting and conservation

In New Zealand, they are protected as native gamebirds, meaning they may be hunted only under licence (from Fish and Game) during the duck shooting season. Sometimes there is an extended season on the West Coast of the South Island of New Zealand. They are not generally hunted for food and most are not collected after the hunting session. They were sometimes eaten by Māori but were considered poor food, being sinewy and tough.  In a written account given over 100 years ago, Māori were described as trapping pūkeko (near Lake Taupo). They would choose a suitable place where pūkeko were known to feed, and drive a series of stakes into the ground. These stakes were connected by a fine flax string. Hair-like nooses (made from cabbage tree fibre) were then dangled at the appropriate height, from the flax string, to catch pūkeko as they fed after dusk, in the low light conditions.

In New Zealand and Australia populations have expanded due to the creation of new artificial lakes and ponds. The subspecies endemic to Palau has been considered endangered as well, although a 2005 survey found that the subspecies, while potentially threatened, is at least now still common.

Life cycle
Nesting, breeding and rearing are as for the general species, see purple swamphen. In New Zealand they nest, typically well hidden in the middle of a clump of raupo, between August (end of winter) and March (start of autumn).  Most eggs are laid between August and February with breeding reaching a peak in spring between September and December. New Zealand pūkeko are joint-nesters and multiple females will lay their eggs in the same nest. The recent development of a useful PCR-based genetic marker to determine the sex of pūkeko has revealed that there is no evidence of sex ratio bias in hatching-order. Patterns of growth, survivorship and adult dominance in this species is therefore attributed to hatching order rather than offspring sex

Roadside behaviour
Birds are often seen singly, or in groups of two to three, foraging for food beside motorways or roadside ditches, and collecting grit.  A study showed that the preferred grit colour is red (followed by yellow and lastly blue) even though red grit is less common. Roadkill is a cause of mortality.

References

External links 

 Pūkeko at New Zealand Birds
 A History of the Birds of New Zealand. Porphyrio Melanonotus — (Swamp-Hen.), Walter Lawry Buller, 1888, London

Australasian swamphen
Birds of Australia
Birds of the Maluku Islands
Birds of New Guinea
Birds of New Zealand
Australasian swamphen
Taxa named by Coenraad Jacob Temminck